Yaxa Dəllək (also, Yakha-Dallyak and Yakhadellyak) is a village and municipality in the Sabirabad Rayon of Azerbaijan.  It has a population of 911.

References 

Populated places in Sabirabad District